The 2020 Midwestern State Mustangs football team represented Midwestern State University as a member of the Lone Star Conference (LSC) during the 2020 NCAA Division II football season. Led by 19th-year head coach Bill Maskill, the team compiled a record of 1–2. The Mustangs played their home games at Memorial Stadium in Wichita Falls, Texas.

Fall season delayed
On August 7, 2020, the Lone Star Conference postponed fall competition for several sports due to the COVID-19 pandemic. A few months later in January 2021, the conference announced that there will be no spring conference competition in football. Teams that opt-in to compete would have to schedule on their own.

Schedule

References

Midwestern State
Midwestern State Mustangs football seasons
Midwestern State Mustangs football